Hickory Point Township is located in Macon County, Illinois. As of the 2010 census, its population was 18,523 and it contained 8,562 housing units.

Cities and towns 
 Decatur (north part)
 Forsyth

Adjacent townships 
 Maroa Township (north)
 Friends Creek Township (northeast)
 Whitmore Township (east)
 Decatur Township (southeast and south)
 Harristown Township (southwest)
 Illini Township (west)
 Austin Township (northwest)

Geography

Demographics

References

External links

City-data.com
Illinois State Archives

Townships in Macon County, Illinois
1859 establishments in Illinois
Populated places established in 1859
Townships in Illinois